Trishna  may refer to:
 Taṇhā, the Buddhist concept of thirst or desire
 Trishna (Vedic thought), the Vedic concept of thirst or desire
 Trishna (1978 film), a drama directed and produced by Sippy Films in India
 Thrishna, a 1981 Malayalam film by I. V. Sasi
 Trishna (2009 film), a romance film directed by Pritam Jalan
 Trishna (2011 film), a film adaptation of Tess of the d'Urbervilles and directed by Michael Winterbottom
 Trishna (TV show), a romantic Indian TV show on Doordarshan
 Trishna (yacht), a yacht belonging to the Corps of Engineers of the Indian Army
 Krishna and Trishna, Bangladeshi conjoined twins